Cristina Sheehan (born 26 September 1998) is an Australian synchronised swimmer. She competed in the team event at the 2016 Summer Olympics.

References

External links
 
 

1998 births
Living people
Australian synchronised swimmers
Olympic synchronised swimmers of Australia
Synchronized swimmers at the 2016 Summer Olympics
Swimmers from Brisbane
Sportswomen from Queensland